Princess Alexandra Victoria of Schleswig-Holstein-Sonderburg-Glücksburg (21 April 1887 – 15 April 1957) was the second-eldest child and daughter of Frederick Ferdinand, Duke of Schleswig-Holstein and his wife Princess Karoline Mathilde of Schleswig-Holstein-Sonderburg-Augustenburg.

Early life

Princess Alexandra Victoria was born on 21 April 1887 at Grünholz Castle in Schleswig-Holstein, Prussia as the second-eldest child and daughter of Frederick Ferdinand, Duke of Schleswig-Holstein and his wife Princess Karoline Mathilde of Schleswig-Holstein-Sonderburg-Augustenburg, a great-niece of Queen Victoria.

Alexandra Victoria's father was the eldest son of Friedrich, Duke of Schleswig-Holstein-Sonderburg-Glücksburg and a nephew of Christian IX of Denmark. He had succeeded to the headship of the House of Schleswig-Holstein-Sonderburg-Glücksburg and the title of duke upon the death of his father on 27 November 1885.

Marriages and issue

Prince August Wilhelm

Alexandra Victoria's first husband was her first cousin Prince August Wilhelm of Prussia, the son of Wilhelm II, German Emperor and his wife Augusta Victoria, a sister of Alexandra Victoria's mother.

They married on 22 October 1908 at the Royal Palace of Berlin. The marriage was arranged by the Emperor and Empress, but it was relatively happy. Alexandra was a great favorite of her mother-in-law, especially since the Empress was also her own aunt. A contemporary of the court, Princess Catherine Radziwill, commented that Alexandra "had always shown herself willing to listen to her mother-in-law. She is a nice girl - fair, fat, and a perfect type of the 'Deutsche Hausfrau' dear to the souls of German novel-writers". Another contemporary wrote that the marriage had been a love match, and that Alexandra was a "charmingly pretty, bright girl".

The couple had planned to take up residence in Schönhausen Palace in Berlin, but changed their mind when August Wilhelm's father decided to leave his son the Villa Liegnitz in the Sanssouci Park in Potsdam. Their residence developed into a meeting place for artists and scholars.

Alexandra Victoria and August Wilhelm had one son:

Prince Alexander Ferdinand of Prussia (26 December 1912 – 12 June 1985)

During the First World War, August Wilhelm was made district administrator (Landrat) of the district of Ruppin; his office and residence was now Schloss Rheinsberg. His personal adjutant Hans Georg von Mackensen, with whom he had been close friends since his youth, played an important role in his life. These "pronounced homophilic tendencies" contributed to the failure of his marriage to Princess Alexandra Victoria. They never undertook a formal divorce due to the opposition of  August Wilhelm's father, Kaiser Wilhelm II.

After the fall of the German monarchy in 1918, the couple divorced on 16 March 1920.

Arnold Rümann
Her second husband was Arnold Rümann, whom she married on 7 January 1922 at Grünholz Castle. In 1926, Alexandra moved for a time to New York City, where she worked as a painter. She and Arnold were divorced in 1933.

Later life
After World War II, Alexandra lived in a trailer near Wiesbaden, where she earned a living as a portrait and landscape painter. She died on 14 April 1957 in a hotel in Lyons, France.

Ancestry

References

Sources

House of Hohenzollern
Princesses of Schleswig-Holstein-Sonderburg-Glücksburg
1887 births
1957 deaths
People from the Province of Schleswig-Holstein
Prussian princesses